The climate of Seattle is temperate, classified in the Mediterranean zone by the most common climate classification (Köppen: Csb) but some sources put the city in the oceanic zone (Trewartha: Do). It has cool, wet winters and mild, relatively dry summers, covering characteristics of both. The climate is sometimes characterized as a "modified Mediterranean" climate because it is cooler and wetter than a "true" Mediterranean climate, but shares the characteristic dry summer (which has a strong influence on the region's vegetation). The city and environs are part of USDA hardiness zone 8b, with isolated coastal pockets falling under 9a.

Records for the Seattle City area date back to 1894, with records at Seattle-Tacoma International Airport beginning in 1945.

Seattle generally does not experience many extremes of weather. Thunderstorms are rare, as the city reports thunder on just seven days per year. Similarly, the city typically receives at least light snowfall every year, though heavy snowfall is uncommon.

Temperature
The city's regime of temperature features small seasonal swings, due to its proximity to the ocean. The Pacific ocean, Puget Sound and Lake Washington serve as moderators of the temperature meaning the city is milder than areas inland during the winter and cooler during the summer. Extreme heatwaves are rare, as are cold temperatures. 
Hot temperature extremes are enhanced by dry, compressed wind from the west slopes of the Cascades, while cold temperatures are generated mainly from the Fraser Valley in British Columbia. Records are taken from the Seattle City area from 1894 to 1944 and at Sea-Tac Airport from 1945.

Averages
Temperatures above  and below  are very rare, with the last occurrences being June 28, 2021 and November 24, 2010, respectively.

Highest daily temperatures

Lowest daily temperatures

Daily record warm minima

Daily record cold maxima

Highest averages

Lowest averages

Precipitation

The city sees frequent, though light rainfall between October and May, with rainfall becoming lighter and sparser between June and September. With many more "rain days" than other major American cities, Seattle has a well-earned reputation for frequent rain. In an average year, at least  of precipitation falls on 150 days, more than nearly all U.S. cities east of the Rocky Mountains. In November, Seattle averages more rainfall than any other U.S. city of more than 250,000 people; it also ranks highly in winter precipitation. Conversely, the city receives some of the lowest precipitation amounts of any large city from June to September. Seattle is one of the five rainiest major U.S. cities as measured by the number of days with precipitation. However, because Seattle often has merely a light drizzle falling from the sky for many days, it actually receives significantly less rainfall (or other precipitation) overall than many other U.S. cities like New York City, Miami, or Houston. Seattle experiences its heaviest rainfall during November, December, and January, receiving roughly half of its annual rainfall (by volume) during this period. In late fall and early winter, atmospheric rivers (also known as "Pineapple Express" systems), strong frontal systems, and Pacific low-pressure systems are common. Light rain and drizzle are the predominant forms of precipitation during the remainder of the year.

Annually, total precipitation averages , with winter being the wettest season and July the driest month. At Sea-Tac, rain has fallen in every month since records began there in January 1945, previously in the Seattle City area, the July's of 1896 and 1922 reported no precipitation. Long stretches of little precipitation can occur. The city also sees snow, primarily in winter, but sometimes in the late autumn and early spring. Seattle typically receives some snowfall on an annual basis but heavy snow is rare. From winter season to winter season, amounts can be extremely variable.

Due to local variations in microclimate, Seattle also receives significantly lower precipitation than some other locations west of the Cascades.

One of many exceptions to Seattle's reputation as a damp location occurs in El Niño years, when marine weather systems track as far south as California and less than the usual precipitation falls in the Puget Sound area. Since the region's water comes from mountain snow packs during the dry summer months, El Niño winters can not only produce substandard skiing but can result in water rationing and a shortage of hydroelectric power the following summer.

Averages

Rainfall Extremes

Lowest

Highest

Snowfall

Highest

Other phenomena

Sunshine, UV and daylight
The city generally experiences cloudy conditions, with clear days occurring infrequently. As a result of the city's latitude, it experiences a moderate difference in daylight hours between summer and winter, though is not subject to the extremes of cities further north. The Seattle area is the cloudiest region of the United States, due in part to frequent storms and lows moving in from the adjacent Pacific Ocean. Seattle is cloudy 201 days out of the year and partly cloudy 93 days.

Wind
The Puget Sound Convergence Zone is an important feature of Seattle's weather. In the convergence zone, air arriving from the north meets air flowing in from the south. Both streams of air originate over the Pacific Ocean; airflow is split by the Olympic Mountains to Seattle's west, then reunited to the east. When the air currents meet, they are forced upward, resulting in convection. Thunderstorms caused by this activity are usually weak and can occur north and south of town, but Seattle itself rarely receives more than occasional thunder and small hail showers. In December 2007, a strong windstorm brought hurricane force winds and heavy rain, leading to 5 deaths.

Climate change
Being a coastal city, Seattle may experience significant effects from rising sea levels. It is expected that by this time, frequent flooding will become a problem, with now-annual extreme king tide's becoming monthly or even daily events.

Temperature
The temperature in Seattle has generally increased steadily and this trend is expected to continue due to anthropogenic warming. By the end of the century, it is predicted that there will be on average around two weeks of  days each year.

Precipitation
Precipitation in the city has increased slightly, but this trend is expected to continue. Extreme rainfall events have become more frequent over the previous years and this trend is also expected to continue.

Station data

Explanatory notes

References

Seattle
Seattle